Fillmore may refer to:

Places

Canada 
 Fillmore, Saskatchewan
 Rural Municipality of Fillmore No. 96, Saskatchewan

United States 
 Fillmore, California
 Fillmore District, San Francisco, California
 Fillmore, Louisiana
 Fillmore, Illinois
 Fillmore Township, Montgomery County, Illinois
 Fillmore, Indiana
 Fillmore, Kentucky
 Fillmore Township, Michigan
 Fillmore, Minnesota
 Fillmore County, Minnesota
 Fillmore Township, Minnesota
 Fillmore, Missouri
 Fillmore County, Nebraska
 Fillmore, New York
 Fillmore, Ohio
 Fillmore, Oklahoma
 Fillmore, Utah
 Fillmore, Wisconsin

Venues 
 Fillmore Auditorium (Denver), Colorado
 The Fillmore (Fillmore Auditorium) San Francisco, California promoter Bill Graham's original West Coast concert location
 Fillmore East in New York City, New York, Bill Graham's East Coast concert location (1968 to 1971)
 Fillmore West in San Francisco, California, Bill Graham's subsequent West Coast concert location (1968 to 1971)
 The Fillmore Detroit in Detroit, Michigan
 Irving Plaza, known as "The Fillmore New York" in the late 2000s
 Theatre of the Living Arts (TLA) in Philadelphia, Pennsylvania, briefly known as The Fillmore at TLA and referred to locally as The Fillmore Philadelphia
 The Fillmore Philadelphia, a separate venue in the Fishtown neighborhood of Philadelphia opened in late 2015
 The Fillmore Silver Spring, a venue in Silver Spring, Maryland
 The Fillmore Miami Beach, a venue in Miami Beach, Florida
 AvidxChange Music Factory, home to a venue named the Fillmore Charlotte in Charlotte, North Carolina

Fictional characters 
 Fillmore (Cars), a character from Cars
 Fillmore, a character in Sherman's Lagoon
 Fillmore, a bear in Hoppity Hooper 
 Fillmore, a pimp in The Warriors

Other uses
 Fillmore (film), a 1971 music documentary
 Fillmore!, an animated television program
 Fillmore Block, a place in Wright County, Iowa
 Fillmore High School, a high school in Fillmore, California

People with the surname

 Charles Fillmore (Unity Church) (1854–1948), one of the founders of the Unity Church
 Charles J. Fillmore (1929–2014), linguist, (co-)inventor of Case Theory and Construction Grammar
 Henry Fillmore (1881–1956), American bandmaster and band composer
 Millard Fillmore (1800–1874), thirteenth president of the United States
 Abigail Fillmore (1798–1853), first wife of Millard Fillmore
 Caroline Fillmore (1813–1881), second wife of Millard Fillmore
 Nathaniel Fillmore (1771–1863), farmer and father of Millard Fillmore
 Walter Fillmore (1933–2017), Brigadier General, USMC Ret.

See also 
 Filmore (disambiguation)
 "Fillmore Jive", a song by Pavement from Crooked Rain, Crooked Rain
 Phillimore (disambiguation)
 Philmore, a Christian rock band